Tibor Szaban (born 21 July 1963) is a Slovakian former football player and coach. His preferred playing position is as a defender.

External links
 
 
 Tibor Szaban: Nech je polovica áčka z vlastnej liahne!
 NOVINKY-ÚJDONSÁGOK 1999/2000

1963 births
Living people
Slovak footballers
Association football defenders
FC Lokomotíva Košice players
FC DAC 1904 Dunajská Streda players
Kedah Darul Aman F.C. players
Czech First League players
Slovak expatriate footballers
Expatriate footballers in Malaysia
Slovak expatriate sportspeople in Malaysia
Slovak football managers
People from Rožňava